Norway participated at the 2010 Youth Olympic Games in Singapore.

The Norwegian squad consisted of 5 athletes competing in 4 sports: aquatics (swimming), sailing, shooting and wrestling.

Medalists

Sailing

One Person Dinghy

Shooting

Rifle

Swimming

Wrestling

Freestyle

Greco-Roman

References

External links
Competitors List: Norway

Nations at the 2010 Summer Youth Olympics
2010 in Norwegian sport
Norway at the Youth Olympics